The 2011 NCAA Division II football season, part of college football in the United States organized by the National Collegiate Athletic Association at the Division II level, began on September 1, 2011, and concluded with the NCAA Division II Football Championship on December 17, 2011 at Braly Municipal Stadium in Florence, Alabama, hosted by the University of North Alabama. The Pittsburg State Gorillas defeated the Wayne State Warriors, 35–21, to win their second Division II national title.

The Harlon Hill Trophy was awarded to Jonas Randolph, running back from Mars Hill.

Conference and program changes
The Great American Conference began play this season with nine member teams from Arkansas and Oklahoma.

Ohio Dominican completed their transition to Division II and became eligible for the postseason.

Conference standings

Super Region 1

Super Region 2

Super Region 3

Super Region 4

Conference summaries

Postseason

The 2011 NCAA Division II Football Championship playoffs were the 38th single-elimination tournament to determine the national champion of men's NCAA Division II college football. The championship game was held at Braly Municipal Stadium in Florence, Alabama for the 24th time.

Seeded teams
CSU Pueblo
Delta State
Mars Hill
Midwestern State
Nebraska–Kearney
New Haven
Pittsburg State
Winston-Salem State

Playoff bracket 

* Home team    † Overtime

See also
 2011 NCAA Division I FBS football season
 2011 NCAA Division I FCS football season
 2011 NCAA Division III football season
 2011 NAIA football season

References